Haider Khel is a village in North Waziristan, Pakistan,  to the east of Bannu, lying close to the border with Afghanistan. Its inhabitants are mainly Pashtun-speaking Dawaris

History
Haider Khel was founded in 1910, by Haji Mirzali Khan.

In 1896, during the Tochi Expedition, the British set up a military post in the village as part of its defences against raids from the Waziris.

References

Populated places in North Waziristan